Jeannette Eleanor Wirz CBE (née Altwegg; 8 September 1930 – 18 June 2021) was a British figure skater who competed in ladies' singles. She was the 1952 Olympic champion, the 1948 Olympic bronze medalist, the 1951 World champion, and a double (1951 & 1952) European champion.

Life and career

Early life 
Altwegg was born on 8 September 1930 in Bombay, India. She was raised in Liverpool , the daughter of a Scottish mother and Swiss father. She was a competitive tennis player, reaching the junior finals at Wimbledon in 1947 before giving up the sport to focus on skating.

Skating career 
Altwegg was coached by Jacques Gerschwiler and was known for her strong compulsory figures. She won bronze at the 1948 Winter Olympics in St. Moritz, Switzerland, finishing third behind Barbara Ann Scott of Canada and Eva Pawlik of Austria. In 1951, she stood atop the podium at the European Championships in Zurich and at the World Championships in Milan.

Altwegg successfully defended her continental title at the 1952 European Championships in Vienna. She was awarded gold at the 1952 Winter Olympics in Oslo, Norway, ahead of Tenley Albright of the United States and Jacqueline du Bief of France. She became the first British woman to win an individual gold medal at a Winter Olympics. Her achievement was not matched until the 2010 Winter Olympics in Vancouver when Amy Williams won gold in skeleton. Altwegg was the first British woman to have won two individual medals (gold and bronze) at the Winter Olympics. 

After her Olympic victory, Altwegg bypassed a lucrative professional career due to a knee injury. In 1953, she was awarded the Commander of the Order of the British Empire (CBE). She was inducted into the World Figure Skating Hall of Fame in 1993.

Later life 
After retiring from skating, Altwegg worked at Pestalozzi Children's Village in Switzerland. She married Marc Wirz, the brother of Swiss skater Susi Wirz. They had four children before divorcing in 1973. Their daughter Christina Wirz was a member of Switzerland's 1983 World champion curling team. In June 2021, the death of Altwegg was announced in Switzerland.

Results

References

1930 births
2021 deaths
British female single skaters
Commanders of the Order of the British Empire
Figure skaters at the 1948 Winter Olympics
Figure skaters at the 1952 Winter Olympics
Olympic figure skaters of Great Britain
Olympic gold medallists for Great Britain
Olympic bronze medallists for Great Britain
Olympic medalists in figure skating
English Olympic medallists
British people of Swiss descent
World Figure Skating Championships medalists
European Figure Skating Championships medalists
Sportspeople from Mumbai
Medalists at the 1948 Winter Olympics
Medalists at the 1952 Winter Olympics
Sportswomen from Maharashtra
Sportspeople from Liverpool